Richard Matthew Schweidler (August 18, 1914 – March 18, 2010) was an American football player who played three seasons with the Chicago Bears of the National Football League (NFL). He attended La Grange High School in La Grange, Illinois. He was also a member of the Chicago Gunners and Montreal Alouettes.

Professional career
Schweidler played for the Chicago Gunners in 1936. He played for the NFL's Chicago Bears during the 1938, 1939 and 1946 seasons. He played in six games for the Montreal Alouettes of the Canadian Football League in 1947.

Personal life
Schweidler served in the United States Army during World War II and played football for the Camp Cooke football team in California.

References

External links
Just Sports Stats

1914 births
2010 deaths
Players of American football from Indiana
American football halfbacks
Canadian football running backs
American players of Canadian football
Chicago Bears players
Montreal Alouettes players
United States Army personnel of World War II
People from Marshall County, Indiana